Bigfork High School, part of Bigfork School District, is located in Bigfork, Montana. They are known as the Vikings and Valkyries.

References

External links

Public high schools in Montana
Schools in Flathead County, Montana